Methylocapsa acidiphila is a bacterium. It is a methane-oxidizing and dinitrogen-fixing acidophilic bacterium first isolated from Sphagnum bog. Its cells are aerobic, gram-negative, colourless, non-motile, curved coccoids that form conglomerates covered by an extracellular polysaccharide matrix. The cells use methane and methanol as sole sources of carbon and energy. B2T (= DSM 13967T = NCIMB 13765T) is the type strain.

References

Further reading
Margesin, Rosa, ed. Permafrost soils. Vol. 16. Springer, 2009.

External links 

LPSN
WORMS entry
Type strain of Methylocapsa acidiphila at BacDive -  the Bacterial Diversity Metadatabase

Beijerinckiaceae
Bacteria described in 2002